The Ranally city rating system is a tool developed by Rand McNally & Co. to classify U.S. cities based on their economic function.  The system is designed to reflect an underlying hierarchy whereby consumers and businesses go to a city of a certain size for a certain function; some functions are widely available and others are only available in the largest cities.

The system was developed for Rand McNally by geographer Richard L. Forstall and released in 1964.  The city rankings are updated periodically in the Rand McNally Commercial Atlas and Marketing Guide, an annual two-volume set, which is available in many libraries.  Among the criteria for categorization are retail sales, newspaper circulation, and the presence of universities and hospitals and corporate headquarters.  The size of the city's tributary area is critical to determining whether it will be rated a 2, 3, or 4.  As of 2006, there are 1492 cities rated.

The system consists of a number and a letter.  The number reflects a city's importance in the national hierarchy. Nationally important business centers are ranked 1.  Regional business centers are ranked 2.  Significant local business centers are ranked 3 and business centers whose importance is purely local are ranked 4.  the letter reflects its importance in its own area.  Doubled letters serve to distinguish centers within a class. The most important center in a market (trading area) is given some kind of A.  Other business centers in the same market area will be given B or C depending on their importance.   For example, Dallas is rated 1-AA (a nationally important business center) and Fort Worth is rated 2-BB.  B cities constitute basic trading centers, while C cities do not.

Rand McNally divides the country into basic trading areas (487 as of 2008), each of which has exactly one A-rated city.  The basic trading areas are aggregated into major trading areas, of which there are 51.  The Federal Communications Commission uses these areas for determining wireless territory boundaries.

New York City has always been given the unique rating 1-AAAA due to its preeminent status in the national hierarchy.  Chicago was originally the only other city rated 1-AAA as having influence over a large area of the country.  In 1988, Los Angeles was similarly given a 1-AAA rating.  Thirteen cities are given the rating 1-AA as major national business centers:  Atlanta, Boston, Cleveland, Dallas, Detroit, Houston, Miami, Minneapolis, Philadelphia, Pittsburgh, St. Louis, San Francisco, and Washington, D.C.

Notes: The B and C cities are secondary because they are in the same market area as a city rated A.

While those are only abstract examples of the ratings, consider how the system works in practice with the example of Ohio.  Rand McNally conceives of Ohio as consisting of nineteen markets (trading areas) with some peripheral counties being contained in trading areas of other states.  The table below shows the nineteen trading areas in order of hierarchy.  Each has an A-rated city.  Some also have other rated cities and suburbs.

Example: Ohio

The system is applied by businesses seeking to serve a network of customers with the greatest efficiency.  For example, a company that services elevators or a wholesaler of paper bags would want to locate its field representatives primarily in A rated cities.  The Rural Health Research Center at the University of Minnesota published a report in 2008 on access to physicians in rural areas which uses the system to evaluate access to physicians in rural areas.

See also
 Metropolis
 Megalopolis (city type)
 Primate city
 Financial centre
 Ecumenopolis
 Global City

References
Rand McNally Commercial Atlas and Marketing Guide, 136th edition, 2005, Skokie, Ill.: Rand McNally.  A complete description of the system is found at Volume 1, pp. 7–8, and rosters of the ratings appear on pp. 74–87 and 129-131.
Richard L. Forstall, ed.  Rand McNally city rating guide: a completely new concept in analyzing markets and planning sales and advertising programs in the 1090 principal business centers of the United States.  Chicago: Rand McNally, 1964.

Cities in the United States
Rating systems